

Events
Swiss composer Jean Baptiste Édouard Du Puy is dismissed by King Gustav IV of Sweden for praising Napoleon.

Classical music
Ludwig van Beethoven – Piano Sonata in C Minor, Op. 13 ("Pathétique"); Piano Sonatas Nos. 9 and 10 (Op. 14, No. 1 and 2)
Benjamin Carr – Dead March and Monody
Joseph Haydn – String Quartets Op. 77
Antonio Salieri – "Der Tyroler Landsturm", secular cantata for soprano, alto, tenor, bass, double choir, orchestra and speaker
Giovanni Paisiello – Sinfonia Funèbre
Louis Spohr – Violin Concerto in G major, WoO 9

Opera
Étienne Méhul – Adrien, Ariodant
Ferdinando Paer – La Camila ossia il Sotteraneo
Antonio Salieri – Falstaff o sia Le tre burle

Births
February 25 – Siegfried Wilhelm Dehn, music theorist (died 1858)
March 21 – Charles Mayer, pianist and composer (died 1862)
April 13 – Ludwig Rellstab, critic (died 1860)
May 26 – Alexander Sergeyevich Pushkin, novelist and lyricist (died 1837)
May 27 – Fromental Halévy, composer (died 1862)
May 30 – Ferdo Livadić, nationalist composer (died 1879)
June 13 – Henri Brod, oboist, instrument builder and composer (died 1839)
September 11 – Giuseppe Persiani, opera composer (died 1869)
October 31 –  Maria Fredrica von Stedingk composer (died 1868)
December 31 – Thomas Täglichsbeck, violinist and composer (died 1867)

Deaths
March 28 – Bendix Friedrich Zinck I, composer (born 1715)
April 1 – Narcís Casanoves i Bertran, composer (born 1747)
April 28 – François Giroust, composer, 62
May 2 – Henri-Joseph Rigel, composer, 58
May 9 – Claude Balbastre, organist, harpsichordist and composer, 74
June 10 – Chevalier de Saint-Georges, composer and violinist, 53
June 18 – Johann Andre, composer (born 1741)
August 16 – Vincenzo Manfredini, composer, 61
September 20 – Polly Young, soprano, composer and keyboard player, 50
October 16 – Antoine-Frédéric Gresnick, composer, 44
October 24 – Carl Ditters von Dittersdorf, composer, 59
date unknown
Narciso Casanovas, composer (born 1747)
Marija Zubova, composer (born 1749)

References

 
18th century in music
Music by year